Heather Thatcher (3 September 1896 – 15 January 1987) was an English actress in theatre and films.

Dancer
By 1922, Thatcher was a dancer. She was especially noted for her interpretation of an Egyptian harem dance. Her exotic clothes were designed in Russia. They featured stencil slits in the waist, trouserettes and sleeves. Her attire was billed as the boldest costume ever shown in Britain.

English theatre
Thatcher played the feminine lead in London stage productions such as Oh Daddy and Warm Corner. At the London Winter Garden she sang and danced in a revue in 1923. In August 1926, she appeared in Thy Name Is Woman at the Q Theatre. It marked her graduation from musical comedy to serious acting.

She continued her London stage work, performing with June Clyde in Lucky Break. Premiering at the Strand Theatre in September 1934, the theatrical presentation was a production of Leslie Henson. In 1937, Thatcher went to America in Full House. The previous season, she was paired with Ivor Novello in the English rendition. Jack Buchanan, Austin Trevor and Coral Browne teamed with Thatcher in Canaries Sometimes Sing (1947). Produced by Firth Shephard, the theatrical presentation opened in Blackpool and moved to London a month later. Thatcher participated in a Salute To Ivor Novello at the London Coliseum in September 1951. The production raised funds to run his old home, Redroofs. It had been purchased by the Actors' Benevolent Fund.

Film career
The Plaything (1929), produced by Castleton Knight and Elstree Studios, begins as a silent film. It develops into a sound film. The theme concerns a Highland laird who falls in love with a hedonistic London heiress. Thatcher plays a prominent role as Martyn Bennett.

In 1931, she visited Hollywood. As a star of English comedy, she was being compared to Marilyn Miller. In the autumn of 1931, she was invited to a reception following the premiere of Strictly Dishonorable (1931), at the Carthay Circle Theatre. Among her friends in films were Anthony Bushell and Zelma O'Neal.

Thatcher was signed by MGM in February 1932. She was given a feature role in But the Flesh Is Weak (1932). The film stars Robert Montgomery and is directed by Jack Conway. The film was adapted from a British stage production which showcased Novello. Thatcher was praised for her performance. German actress, Nora Gregor was found disappointing. The English actress "gives a brilliant performance and creates the only human being in the piece."

Thatcher sued Gloria Swanson British Productions for breach of contract in a suit which was settled in December 1933. During the filming of Perfect Understanding (1933) Thatcher's contract was cancelled before the production was completed. No explanation was given. She was excluded from the film when a new author was hired. The replacement writer chose to eliminate her character.

The Private Life of Don Juan (1934) was also filmed at Elstree Studios. The film has Douglas Fairbanks Sr. as its leading man. Owen Nares plays the title role and Thatcher is Anna Dora, one of the ladies.

Later in her career, Thatcher returned to the UK to make films. Among these is Will Any Gentleman...? (1953), filmed at Elstree Studios in Borehamwood. Thatcher appears together with George Cole and Veronica Hurst. The film was a short adventure about a hypnotist who puts a man in a trance.

Thatcher made her last films in 1955. The Deep Blue Sea has a screenplay written by Terence Rattigan and features Vivien Leigh and Kenneth More. Thatcher depicts Aunt May Luton in Josephine and Men, a comedy starring Glynis Johns and Peter Finch.

Death
Thatcher died in Hillingdon, London in 1987.

Selected filmography

 The Prisoner of Zenda (1915) - Extra (uncredited)
 Altar Chains (1916) - Alice Vaughan
 The Key of the World (1918) - Dina Destin
 Pallard the Punter (1919) - Gladys Callender
 The First Men in the Moon (1919) - Susan
 The Green Terror (1919) - Olive Crosswell
 The Little Hour of Peter Wells (1920) - Camille Pablo
 The Plaything (1929) - Martyn Bennett
 A Warm Corner (1930) - Mimi
 Comets (1930) - Himself
 Stepping Stones (1931)
 But the Flesh Is Weak (1932) - Lady Joan Culver
 It's a Boy (1933) - Anita Gunn
 Loyalties (1933) - Margaret Orme
 The Private Life of Don Juan (1934) - Anna Dora, an Actress as Actresses Go
 The Dictator (1935) - Lady of the Court
 Mama Steps Out (1937) - Nadine Wentworth - the Poet
 The Thirteenth Chair (1937) - Mary Eastwood
 Tovarich (1937) - Lady Kartegann
 Fools for Scandal (1938) - Lady Potter-Porter
 If I Were King (1938) - The Queen
 Girls' School (1938) - Miss Brackett
 Beau Geste (1939) - Lady Patricia Brandon
 Man Hunt (1941) - Lady Alice Risborough
 Son of Fury: The Story of Benjamin Blake (1942) - Maggie Martin
 We Were Dancing (1942) - Mrs. Tyler-Blane
 This Above All (1942) - Nurse (uncredited)
 The Moon and Sixpence (1942) - Rose Waterford (uncredited)
 The Undying Monster (1942) - Christy
 Journey for Margaret (1942) - Mrs. Harris
 Above Suspicion (1943) - English Girl Dancing with Richard (uncredited)
 Flesh and Fantasy (1943) - Lady Flora (uncredited)
 Gaslight (1944) - Lady Dalroy
 Anna Karenina (1948) - Countess Lydia Ivanovna
 Trottie True (1949) - Angela Platt-Brown
 Dear Mr. Prohack (1949) - Lady Maslam
 Encore (1951) - Eva Barrett (segment "Gigolo and Gigolette")
 Father's Doing Fine (1952) - Lady Buckering
 The Hour of 13 (1952) - Mrs. Chumley Orr
 Will Any Gentleman...? (1953) - Mrs. Whittle
 Duel in the Jungle (1954) - Lady on S.S. Nigeria
 The Deep Blue Sea (1955) - Lady Dawson
 Josephine and Men (1955) - Aunt May Luton (final film role)

References

Citations

General
Lima News, "Has London Gone Crazy About Clothes?", 10 December 1922, Page 38.
Lima News, "Why They Covered Up The Three Prettiest Figures in England", 1 April 1923, Page 12.
Los Angeles Times, "English Star Here", 15 September 1931, Page A9.
Los Angeles Times, "Silver Wedding Bells", 4 October 1931, Page I2.
Los Angeles Times, "Society of Cinemaland", 15 November 1931, Page B19.
Los Angeles Times, "Heather Thatcher With MGM", 2 February 1932, Page A9.
Los Angeles Times, "English Play Being Screened", 21 February 1932, Page B11.
Los Angeles Times, "Feeble Follow-Up", 24 April 1932, Page B15.
New York Times, "London Stage Notes", 22 August 1926, Page X1.
New York Times, "London Film Notes", 6 October 1929, Page X9.
New York Times, "Don Juan Is To Be A Film Hero", 17 January 1934, Page X2.
New York Times, "The Cable Spies on London", 30 September 1934, Page X1.
New York Times, "News of the Stage", 18 September 1936, Page 19.
New York Times, "London Notes", 25 October 1947, Page 13.
The Times, "Actress' Action Settled", Wednesday, 13 December 1933, Page 4.
The Times, "Stage Tribute To Ivor Novello", Saturday, 8 September 1951, Page 8.

External links

English stage actresses
English film actresses
English silent film actresses
English female dancers
1896 births
1987 deaths
20th-century English actresses
20th-century English singers
20th-century English women singers